Horace Edward Jelly (28 August 1921 – 16 January 2000) was an English professional footballer who played in the Football League for Leicester City and Plymouth Argyle as a right back.

Personal life 
Jelly served in the Royal Navy during the Second World War.

Career statistics

References

1921 births
2000 deaths
English footballers
English Football League players
Leicester City F.C. players
Plymouth Argyle F.C. players

Association football fullbacks
Clapton Orient F.C. wartime guest players
Royal Navy personnel of World War II
FA Cup Final players